On 25 April 2022, four people were stabbed to death in Bermondsey, London, United Kingdom.

In the early hours of the morning of 25 April, neighbours heard screams from a three-bedroomed terraced house in Delaford Road, Bermondsey, in south London, England. Police attended at 1:40 am, discovering the bodies of three women and a man inside the house. They were a 64-year-old Jamaican woman, her 58-year-old partner, as well as her 45-year-old daughter, and 28-year-old granddaughter.

Police arrested a 28-year-old man at the scene and said they are not looking for anyone else. On 28 April, the man, Joshua Jacques (born 19 April 1994), was charged with four counts of murder.

References

2022 in London
April 2022 crimes in Europe
April 2022 events in the United Kingdom
Attacks in the United Kingdom in 2022
2022 stabbing
Stabbing attacks in 2022
Stabbing attacks in London